David Harmon may refer to:

 David Harman, American lightweight rower (sometimes listed as Harmon)
 David Harmon (wrestler) (born 1967), Irish Olympic wrestler
 David P. Harmon (1919–2001), American scenarist and producer